Sunan may refer to:

Hadith collections in Islam:
Sunan Abi Da'ud
Sunan al-Tirmidhi
Sunan al-Sughra
Sunan Ibn Maja
Sunan (Indonesian title), honorary title in Java island, Indonesia
Sunan Yugur Autonomous County, in Gansu, China
Sunan-guyŏk, a district of Pyongyang, North Korea
Pyongyang Sunan International Airport
Southern Jiangsu province, in China
Sunan Shuofang International Airport in Southern Jiangsu